Camelot is a feature on Earth's Moon, a crater in Taurus-Littrow valley.  Astronauts Eugene Cernan and Harrison Schmitt visited it in 1972, on the Apollo 17 mission, during EVA 2.  Geology Station 5 was along the south rim of Camelot.

Camelot is due 700 meters west of the landing site.  The smaller Horatio crater is to the southwest, and Victory is to the northwest.  Powell and Trident are to the southeast.

The crater was named by the astronauts after the castle Camelot of Arthurian legend.

References

External links
43D1S2(25) Apollo 17 Traverses at Lunar and Planetary Institute
Geological Investigation of the Taurus-Littrow Valley: Apollo 17 Landing Site

Impact craters on the Moon
Apollo 17